"(I've Been) Searchin' So Long" is a song written by James Pankow for the group Chicago and recorded for their album Chicago VII (1974). The first single released from that album, it reached number 9 on the U.S. Billboard Hot 100. It also hit number 8 on the Adult Contemporary chart. In Canada, the song peaked at number 5.

Background
Cash Box said that "this dreamy, progressive ballad [is] reminiscent of...Yes and the Beach Boys with that definite patented Chicago drive," and also praised the "sensitive musical execution and slowly intensifying vocals."

Personnel
Peter Cetera – lead vocals, bass guitar, fretless bass
Robert Lamm – Fender Rhodes electric piano, Minimoog synthesizer, backing vocals
Terry Kath – phased/fuzzed wah-wah electric guitar, backing vocals
Danny Seraphine – drums
Lee Loughnane – trumpet, backing vocals
James Pankow – trombone, percussion, backing vocals
Walter Parazaider – tenor saxophone

Additional Personnel 
David J. Wolinski – ARP synthesizer
Laudir de Oliveira – congas
Jimmie Haskell – strings

Chart performance

Weekly charts

Year-end charts

References

1974 singles
Chicago (band) songs
Songs written by James Pankow
Song recordings produced by James William Guercio
Columbia Records singles
1974 songs